Frank Ewert (born 1963) is a German agricultural scientist, Scientific Director of the Leibniz Centre for Agricultural Landscape Research (ZALF) and Professor of Crop Production at the University of Bonn. 

His areas of expertise include crop science, production ecology, systems analysis, and plant growth modelling. His work focuses on sustainability and impact assessments of the influence of climate change on crop production systems, food security, and resource conservation.

Professional career 

Ewert studied agricultural sciences at the University of Rostock (Germany) from 1983 to 1988. From 1988 to 1993 doctoral studies followed at the University of Rostock. He continued his scientific career in 1995 as a research associate at the Long Ashton Research Station of the University of Bristol and the Agricultural and Food Research Council (AFRC) in the UK. From 1995 to 2002, Frank Ewert worked as an Assistant and Associate Research Professor at the Department of Agricultural Sciences, Royal Veterinary and Agricultural University, later at the University of Copenhagen in Denmark. From 2002 to 2008, he was a senior scientist at the Department of Plant Sciences at Wageningen University in the Netherlands.

In 2008, he was called to the University of Bonn, where he has since been Professor of Crop Science at the Institute of Crop Science and Resource Conservation (INRES). There, he also leads the working group on crop production.

Effective March 1, 2016, Frank Ewert took over as Scientific Director at the Leibniz Center for Agricultural Landscape Research (ZALF) in Müncheberg near Berlin. He was granted leave of absence from the University of Bonn to perform this function.

In 2002 and 2012 Frank Ewert received calls from the Technical University of Munich (Professorship of Organic Agriculture) and the University of Reading (Professor of Crop Science), which he did not accept.

Current memberships 

 Spokesman of the NFDI4Agri consortium (National Research Data Infrastructure for Agricultural Sciences)
 Member of the Scientific Group of the UN Secretary-General’s 2021 Food Systems Summit
 Chair of the Supervisory Board of Research Programme LIL (Land-Innovation Lausitz)
 Member of the "Research Steering Committee“ for the Federal Ministry of Food and Agriculture
 Member of the International Advisory Board of the PE&RC Graduate School for Production Ecology & Resource Conservation, University of Wageningen
 Co-chair and member of the international organizing committee of the International Crop Modelling Symposium, iCROPM 2016 and iCROPM 2020
 Member of the Steering Group of the DFG Excellence Cluster „PhenoRob“
 Member of the AgMIP Leaders Forum
 Co-chair of the Wheat Initiative's Working Group on Plant Modeling
 Chairman of the consortium council of the program „WIR Land Innovation Lausitz“ (BMBF)
 Member of the editorial board of various journals, a. o. “Field Crops Research”, “European Journal of Agronomy”, “Nature Scientific Reports”,  "Socio-Environmental Systems Modeling (SESMO)" and in the past (2002-2015) “Agriculture, Ecosystems and Environment”

Awards 

 Research Award for Foreign Specialists, administered by the National Institute of Agro-Environmental Sciences, Japan
 Highly Cited Researcher 2016 (Web of Science)
 Highly Cited Researcher 2017 (Web of Science)
 Highly Cited Researcher 2018 (Web of Science)
 Highly Cited Researcher 2019 (Web of Science)
 Highly Cited Researcher 2020 (Web of Science)
 Highly Cited Researcher 2021 (Web of Science)
 Highly Cited Researcher 2022 (Web of Science)

Publications 

 Publications at ZALF
 Publications by Frank Ewert on Google Scholar
 Frank Ewert on ResearchGate

Weblinks

Selection of media contributions, interviews and panel discussions 

 Faces of PhenoRob: Frank Ewert (24.02.2023)
 querFELDein podcast episode with Prof. Frank Ewert: #21 "Wie gut ist Deutschland auf Schocks in der Landwirtschaft vorbereitet?" (How well prepared is Germany for shocks in agriculture?) (27.10.2022)
 querFELDein podcast episode with Prof. Frank Ewert: #18 "Was wird aus den Vorschlägen der Zukunftskommission Landwirtschaft?" (What will become of the proposals of the "Zukunftskommission Landwirtschaft"?) (04.08.2022)
 Ist mehr Vielfalt in der Landwirtschaft möglich? Das ZALF-Landschaftslabor patchCROP (Is more diversity in agriculture possible? The ZALF landscape laboratory patchCROP), video with Prof. Frank Ewert (02.07.2021)

 Panel discussion, The European Food System: The transition towards sustainability and climate mitigation, FACCE 10 Year Event (26.11.2020)
 „W wie Wissen“, „Das Ende der Bauernregeln“ (The end of peasant rules) (14.11.2020)
 Interview with ZALF Director Prof. Frank Ewert and Dr. Annette Piorr: Regional or global supply systems: Will the Corona Pandemic Change Agriculture? (15.07.2020)
 Prof. Frank Ewert on Deutschlandradio: „Droht eine neue Dürresaison?“ (Is there a threat of a new drought season?) (21.04.2020)
 „Fragen an … Prof. Frank Ewert: Quo vadis deutsche Landwirtschaft?“ (Questions for ... Prof. Frank Ewert: Quo vadis German agriculture?) (11.12.2019)
 querFELDein TALK #1: "Dürre Aussichten? Landwirtschaft im Klimawandel" (Dry prospects? Agriculture and Climate Change) (22.10.2019)
 ZDF Documentary (extract) „Bauern im Hitzestress“ (Farmers in heat stress) (19.08.2019)
 „Prof. Frank Ewert im Interview: Ist die Landwirtschaft auf den Klimawandel vorbereitet?“ (Prof. Frank Ewert in an interview: Is agriculture prepared for climate change?) (30.07.2018)
 Interview: Prof. Dr. Frank Ewert, Scientific Director of ZALF: Climate change, food security, sustainability - Solving the challenges of the future at the landscape level. (2017)
 „Prof. Frank Ewert wird Wissenschaftlicher Direktor des ZALF Müncheberg“ (Prof. Frank Ewert becomes Scientific Director of ZALF Müncheberg) (18.02.2016)
 “Climate change and food - wheat harvests at risk.” Deutsche Welle. (September 2015)

Selection of lectures 

 Welcome Note von Prof. Frank Ewert (ZALF) @ 62nd session of the GPW (Berlin 2019) (06.01.2020)
 PhenoRob seminar with Frank Ewert (14.06.2019)
 100 Years Long-Term Field Experiments at Rothamsted Research, Rothamsted, Invited Plenary Note  21-23 May 2018 (from minute 16.16 on)
 Interdrought-V Internationale Konferenz, Invited Plenary Keynote. Hyderabad, India. 21-25 February 2017
 iCropM2016, International Conference. Welcome Note and Summary. Berlin. 2016
 Climate Smart Agriculture, International Conference, Invited Plenary Key Note UC Davis, USA, 20.3.2013 (from minute 35 on)
 ESA Congress, Invited Planery Keynote. "Will agriculture be able to adapt to climate change and at which scale can we act?" Montpellier, France, 2010

References 

German academics

1963 births
Living people